Ziad Aboultaif  (Arabic: زياد أبو لطيف; born 10 September 1966) is a Canadian politician first elected to represent the riding of Edmonton Manning in the House of Commons in the 2015 federal election.

Before politics
On first coming to Canada, Aboultaif started working as a labourer. He learned the business from the ground up, moving from warehouse to office - eventually opening a business of his own. He was co-owner and co-managed Axxess Furniture Inc., an Edmonton-based furniture distribution business, for 12 years.

Federal politics
Aboultaif was first elected in 2015, campaigning on his credentials as a small business owner. He pledged support for small business with a focus on strengthening the economy through lower taxes.

From 2015 to 2017 he was shadow minister of National Revenue, followed by two years as shadow minister for International Development, then a year as shadow minister for Digital Government.

He has served on a number of Parliamentary committees, including International Trade, Government Operations and Estimates, COVID-19 Pandemic, Foreign Affairs and International Development, Finance and National Revenue.

In 2019, he won re-election, partially on a platform focused on cost of living and support for pipeline development. In early 2021 he introduced a purely symbolic motion in Parliament supporting Canada's oil and gas sector industries.

He voted in support of Bill C-233 - An Act to amend the Criminal Code (sex-selective abortion), which would make it an indictable or a summary offence for a medical practitioner to knowingly perform an abortion solely on the grounds of the child's genetic sex.

Organ donation
In 2003 Aboultaif made a partial-liver donation to his son. In Parliament, he has worked to increase awareness of organ and tissue donation. His ultimately unsuccessful Private Members Bill, C-223, would have established a Canadian Organ Donor Registry to coordinate and promote organ donation throughout Canada.

Personal life
Originally from Lebanon, Aboultaif immigrated to Canada in 1990. He has been married to his wife Elizabeth since 1991 and together they have two sons. His work on community boards earned him both an Alberta Centennial Medal (2005), and a Queen's Diamond Jubilee Medal (2012). Aboultaif is Druze.

Electoral record

References

External links
Parliament of Canada Website: Ziad Aboultaif

1966 births
Living people
Businesspeople from Edmonton
Lebanese Druze
Members of the House of Commons of Canada from Alberta
Conservative Party of Canada MPs
Politicians from Edmonton
Lebanese emigrants to Canada
21st-century Canadian politicians
Canadian politicians of Lebanese descent